"" is the 44th single by Japanese band Zard. It was released 9 April 2008 under B-Gram Records label.

Background
This is the second posthumously released single after vocalist Izumi Sakai's death.

Tsubasa wo Hirogete is self-cover song of Japanese band Deen's second single. The vocalist of Deen band, Ikemori Shuuichi, didn't participate in chorus part, however he appeared as guest member during their What A Beautiful Memory live series. The song was used as theme song in anime movie Detective Conan: Full Score of Fear.

Ai wa Kurayami no Naka de is the re-arranged coupling song from their debut single Good-bye My Loneliness. Japanese singer Aya Kamiki participated in chorus part. The song was used as opening theme for the anime television series Detective Conan. To date,  it is the last Zard song used for Detective Conan.

The songs weren't included in any studio album, however it was released in their compilation album Zard Forever Best: 25th Anniversary in 2016.

It was released in two formats: regular CD edition and limited CD+DVD edition. The DVD disc includes footage from live "What a beautiful memory 2007" of their song Kitto Wasurenai. The jacket cover is same in both editions.

Oricon charting
The single reached #3 rank in its first week. It charted for 12 weeks and sold over 83,000 copies.

Track list

References

2008 singles
Zard songs
Case Closed songs
Songs written by Izumi Sakai
Songs written by Tetsurō Oda
Songs released posthumously
Song recordings produced by Daiko Nagato